The Open University of Sarajevo is a non-profit experimental school for interactive education, social activism and public debate. Themes that the school has dealt with include Neo-Marxism, Yugoslavism, psychoanalysis, Third wave feminism, Crisis theory, Post-Colonialism, Historical revisionism, Post-fascism, social constructionism, revolutionary democracy, linguistic nationalism and philosophy of existence. The school has a festival format and is organized once a year in December. It nurtures the traditions of the Praxis School – a Yugoslav Marxist humanist philosophical movement, whose members were influenced by Western Marxism and organized the Korčula Summer School. The Open University of Sarajevo was an outspoken advocate of the 2014 Bosnia and Herzegovina social riots and called for the continuation of direct democracy that was established by plenums during and subsequently after the riots. The school runs a Free-to-view platform that streams all of its content online, dubbed in various languages, and archives it on its website and YouTube channel. The organizers disagrees using the term school, preferring to use the term platform.

History
The Open University of Sarajevo was founded in 2011 by a select group of leftist professors from the University of Sarajevo in cooperation with the Friedrich Ebert Foundation, the Youth Initiative for Human Rights, the Crvena art and culture association, the Pantheon-Sorbonne University and the Krokodil Literary Festival.   The initial group of founders included prof. Dr. Asim Mujkić from the Faculty of Philosophy, prof. Dr. Enver Kazaz from the Comparative Literature Department of the Faculty of Philosophy and prof. Dr. Dino Abazović from the Faculty of Political Sciences.     Furthermore, the founding committee was joined by numerous other public intellectuals from the Former Yugoslavia, including Sarajevo-born writer and scholar Igor Štiks, award-winning Bosnian film director Jasmila Žbanić, Croatian linguist Snježana Kordić and others.  The first edition of the school was held from 12 to 15 December 2011 in smaller venues, emulating the leftist café tradition of the 1960s, before Nihad Kreševljaković, the director of the Sarajevo War Theatre and grandson of Bosnian historian Hamdija Kreševljaković indirectly joined the project and brought it to his theatre two years later. In 2013 the school established the Center for Interactive Education and Social Action (CODA) with the goal of improving democratic values and promoting social, economic and political participation and emancipation in Bosnian society.  The 2015 edition was the first to include a wider multimedia program and a theatrical performance directed by Serbian experimental theatre director Bojan Đorđev titled Nije to crvena, to je krv (That's not red, that's blood).

Format and venues
The school is organized every December and lasts for four days. Each year's program is formed around a particular question such as What are we afraid of?, subsequently forming topics based on said statement (Why are we afraid of...Yugoslavism?; Why are we afraid of...Marxism?; Why are we afraid of...immigrants? etc.)  Events and lectures are held in three venues, with the main stage being the Sarajevo War Theatre. The other two venues are the National Museum of Bosnia and Herzegovina and the Historical Museum of Bosnia and Herzegovina. Each day's events are organized sequentially starting from the morning. The school follows an interactive and multimedia format with theatre plays, film projections, poetry readings and interactive games being held.  The theatre segments often follow the form of Augusto Boal's Theatre of the Oppressed, and are directed by notable theatre directors from the Former Yugoslavia.   Each day's activities are concluded in the Sarajevo War Theatre where the main round table discussions, lectures, panels and Q&A's are held. An evening symposium tops off the day. Another major aspect of the school's format is the fact that it does not require enrollment or any form of participant registration, instead opting for a grassroots and plenum format.

References

External links
Official website

2011 establishments in Bosnia and Herzegovina
Recurring events established in 2011
Festivals in Sarajevo
Annual events in Bosnia and Herzegovina
Education in Sarajevo
Social philosophy
Marxist theory